Alex Wallau (born January 11, 1945) is a former president of the ABC television network.

Wallau began his career with ABC in 1976, when he joined the network's Sports division under Roone Arledge, then head of ABC Sports. Wallau went on to become a two-time Emmy Award-winning producer and director of ABC's sports coverage. He worked primarily on ABC's boxing coverage with announcer Howard Cosell. In 1986, after Cosell's retirement, Wallau became ABC's boxing analyst.  He was honored by the Boxing Writers Association of America as the top television boxing journalist in his first year.

Wallau moved into management under Bob Iger in 1993 and was named President of ABC in 2000, with oversight of 11 divisions, including Entertainment, News, Sports, Finance & Sales. In 2007, he joined The Walt Disney Company's Corporate Strategy, Business Development & Technology Group as Senior Strategic Advisor. In 2017, he moved to the new DTCI division which created new streaming services including Disney+. He retired in 2020.

He has served on the Board of Directors of ESPN, the Ad Council and the Paley Center for Media.  In 2006, Wallau was honored by UCLA's Jonsson Comprehensive Cancer Center with their Humanitarian Award. Wallau is a cancer survivor.

References

http://articles.latimes.com/1988-04-15/sports/sp-1613_1_alex-wallau

Living people
American television executives
1945 births
Boxing commentators
Boxing writers
American Broadcasting Company executives
Presidents of the American Broadcasting Company
ESPN executives